Sunaina is an Indian actress and model. She predominantly works in Tamil movies as well as few Telugu, Malayalam and Kannada films. She made her film debut with Telugu film Kumar Vs Kumari (2005) and her Tamil debut Kadhalil Vizhunthen (2008).

Career 
Sunainaa's start to fame was by starring with Nakul in Kadhalil Vizhunthen (2008) which was her first Tamil début. Prior to that, she shot for a short scene in Sivaji (2007), which did not make the final cut. She later starred in Maasilamani (2009), Vamsam (2010) in which she appeared as a beautiful village girl and did very well, and continued with a performance oriented films where she secured her first Filmfare nomination for Neerparavai (2012),in which she played Esther. Her performance was critically praised and she was nominated for the Filmfare Award for Best Actress – Tamil.

After that she appeared in films like Samar (2013), Vanmam (2014) and also gave a guest appearance opposite to Vijay in Theri (2016). She then appeared in Nambiyaar (2016), Kavalai Vendam (2016), Thondan (2017). In 2018, she acted in the drama film Kaali starring  Vijay Antony and  Anjali. Next, the romantic thriller vampires web series Viu original in Nila Nila Odi Vaa from 24 July to 5 September 2018 . She has a few films like Sillu Karupatti (2019) in hand. After a gap she has roped in for comedian Yogi Babu’s film titled Trip (2021). Sunainaa plays the female lead in the action film Laththi (2022) marking her second association with Vishal after Samar.

Brand and advertisement 
Sunaina Launched Tea Trails in Anna Nagar, Chennai.

Filmography

Films

TV series

References

External links

Living people
Actresses in Malayalam cinema
Actresses in Tamil cinema
Indian film actresses
Actresses from Nagpur
Actresses in Kannada cinema
Actresses in Telugu cinema
21st-century Indian actresses
Year of birth missing (living people)